Christian Lue Young (born December 9, 1996) is an American soccer player who plays as a defender for North Carolina FC in USL League One.

Career

Fort Lauderdale CF
Lue Young made his league debut for the club on July 18, 2020, coming on as a 73rd-minute substitute for Brian Rosales in a 2-0 defeat to the Greenville Triumph.

North Carolina FC
On 6 January 2022, Lue Young signed with North Carolina FC of USL League One.
He scored his first goal for the club August 10th, 2022 in injury time to score the winning goal in a 2-1 win over Forward Madison.

References

External links
Christian Lue Young at University of Akron Athletics

1996 births
Living people
Akron Zips men's soccer players
Inter Miami CF II players
North Carolina FC players
USL League One players
USL League Two players
American soccer players
Association football defenders
Army Black Knights men's soccer players
Broward Seahawks men's soccer players
Soccer players from Florida
People from Plantation, Florida
Sportspeople from Broward County, Florida